Driven to Distraction may refer to:

 Driven to Distraction (ADHD), a 1994 book on Attention Deficit Disorder by Edward Hallowell and John Ratey
 Driven to Distraction (2009), a collection of car reviews published by Jeremy Clarkson
 Driven to Distraction (Inspector Morse TV-episode)